Fontanelli is an Italian surname. Notable people with the surname include:

Achille Fontanelli (1775–1838), Italian nationalist and Napoleonic general
Alfonso Fontanelli (1557–1622), Italian composer
Cristina Fontanelli, American actress and opera singer
Fabiano Fontanelli (born 1965), Italian cyclist
Giuseppe Fontanelli, known as Bissietta (1910–1977), Italian painter in Australia

Italian-language surnames